Ernest Melville Rowlands (21 September 1864 – 7 April 1940) was a Welsh international rugby union player who played rugby for Lampeter University and international rugby for Wales.

Personal life
Rowland was born in Neath, 1864 to Evan Rowland and Jane Morris. After graduating from Lampeter University, Rowland took Holy Orders becoming a priest based in North Wales. He married Hannah Lillian Gilbert on 18 June 1896.

Rugby career
Rowland was awarded his first and only cap for Wales while still at Lampeter University. Played against England as part of the 1895 Home Nations Championship, Rowland was brought into the Welsh pack alongside fellow debuts Lewis Cobden Thomas and Evan Richards. This was the fourth time Wales had played England, and just like the three previous matches England were victorious over the Welsh team. Rowland was replaced for the next game, against Ireland, by Willie Thomas of Llandovery College, and never represented Wales again.

International matches played
Wales (rugby union)
  1885

Bibliography

References 

Wales international rugby union players
Welsh rugby union players
Rugby union forwards
1864 births
1940 deaths
Alumni of the University of Wales, Lampeter
Rugby union players from Neath